Fenton Pits is a hamlet in the parish of Lanivet (where the 2011 census was included), Cornwall, England. It is located 2.5 miles south of the town of Bodmin, just off the A30.

References

Hamlets in Cornwall